Dian Slavens (born March 12, 1958) is a Democratic politician from Michigan who served in the Michigan House of Representatives from 2009 to 2015. Slavens represented  the 21st House District, which includes Canton Township, Belleville and Van Buren Township.

She served on the Families, Children and Seniors Committee and the Military and Veterans Affairs Committee. Dian has volunteered at Plymouth-Canton Community Schools, as a Sunday School teacher at Geneva Presbyterian Church in Canton Township and as a Girl Scout leader for the Huron Valley Council. Her priorities included school funding, government efficiency, and encouraging residents to buy local, Michigan-based products.

In 2014, Slavens ran for the 7th district of the Michigan Senate, losing to Republican Senator Patrick Colbeck.

References

Democratic Party members of the Michigan House of Representatives
People from Highland Park, Michigan
Oakland Community College alumni
1958 births
Living people
Women state legislators in Michigan
21st-century American women